Seth A. Hutchinson is an American electrical and computer engineer. He is the Executive Director of the Institute for Robotics and Intelligent Machines at the Georgia Institute of Technology, where he is also Professor and KUKA Chair for Robotics in the School of Interactive Computing. His research in robotics spans the areas of planning, sensing, and control. He has published widely on these topics, and is coauthor of the books "Robot Modeling and Control," published by Wiley, 
Principles of Robot Motion - Theory, Algorithms, and Implementations, with Howie Choset, Kevin M. Lynch, George Kantor, Wolfram Burgard, Lydia E. Kavraki and Sebastian Thrun.

Hutchinson has served as president of the IEEE Robotics and Automation Society (RAS), member of the RAS Administrative Committee, the Editor-in-Chief for the "IEEE Transactions on Robotics" and as the founding Editor-in-Chief of the RAS Conference Editorial Board. He is a Fellow of the IEEE.

Hutchinson is an Emeritus Professor of Electrical and Computer Engineering at the University of Illinois at Urbana-Champaign, where he was Professor of ECE until 2018.
He received his Ph.D. from Purdue University.

References

External links
 Home page
 Photo of Seth Hutchinson

American roboticists
Georgia Tech faculty
Control theorists
Living people
Year of birth missing (living people)